Eugenie Gershoy (January 1, 1901 – May 8, 1986) was an American sculptor and watercolorist.

Life
Gershoy emigrated to New York City with her family in 1903. 
Aided by scholarships, she studied at the Art Students League under Alexander Stirling Calder, Leo Lentelli, Kenneth Hayes Miller, and Boardman Robinson. Around this time, she created a group of portrait figurines of her fellow artists, including Arnold Blanch, Lucile Blanch, Raphael Soyer, William Zorach, Concetta Scaravaglione, and Emil Ganso, which were exhibited as a group at the Whitney Museum of American Art. At age 17, she was awarded the Saint-Gaudens Medal for fine draughtsmanship.

Gershoy married the Romanian-born artist Harry Gottlieb. In the late 1920s and early 1930s, the pair kept a studio in Woodstock, New York. There, Gershoy was influenced by sculptor John Flanagan, who lived and worked nearby.

From 1936 to 1939, Gershoy worked for the WPA Federal Art Project. She collaborated with Max Spivak on murals for the children's recreation room of the Queens Borough Public Library in Astoria, New York. 
She developed a mixture of wheat paste, plaster, and egg tempera, which she used in polychrome papier-mâché sculptures; she was the only New York sculptor to work in polychrome at this time. She also designed cement and mosaic sculptures of animals and figures to be placed in New York City playgrounds. Alongside others employed by the FAP, she participated in a sit-down strike in Washington, DC, to advocate for better pay and improved working conditions for the projects' artists.

Gershoy's first solo exhibition was held at the Robinson Gallery in New York in 1940. She moved to San Francisco in 1942, and began teaching ceramics at the California School of Fine Arts in 1946. In 1950, she studied at the artists' colony at Yaddo.

Gershoy traveled extensively throughout her life. She visited England and France in the early 1930s, and worked in Paris in 1951. She traveled to Mexico and Guatemala in the late 1940s, and also toured Africa, India, and the Orient in 1955.

In 1977, Gershoy dedicated a sculpture to Audrey McMahon, who was actively involved in the creation of the Federal Art Project and served as its regional director in New York, in recognition of the work McMahon provided struggling artists in the 1930s.

Gershoy's work is in the collections of the Whitney Museum of American Art, the Metropolitan Museum of Art, and the Smithsonian American Art Museum.
Her papers are held at Syracuse University.

Gallery

References

External links

Oral history interview with Eugenie Gershoy, 1964 Oct. 15
photo Eugenie Gershoy: Arnold Blanch,1934
Paintings by Eugenie Gershoy, at Artfact
Eugenie Gershoy, "To Work as a Sculptor" blog

1901 births
1986 deaths
American women sculptors
Artists from the San Francisco Bay Area
Art Students League of New York alumni
20th-century American painters
American muralists
American women painters
20th-century American sculptors
20th-century American male artists
20th-century American women artists
Emigrants from the Russian Empire to the United States
Women muralists
Federal Art Project artists
Sculptors Guild members
Sculptors from California
Sculptors from New York (state)